The HAL HTFE-25 ("Hindustan Turbo Fan Engine") is a 25 kN turbofan engine under development by Hindustan Aeronautics Limited (HAL). The engine can be used in single engine trainer jets, business jets and UAVs weighing up to 5 tonnes and in twin engine configuration for same weighing up to 9 tonnes. Based on the technical feasibility, the market potential for engine is of 200-250 units.

Two engines have been produced and completed 339 runs as of 2019 out of which 96 runs were conducted in 2018-19. Engine has successfully completed cold starting test at 14 °C with spark igniters and has also achieved 100 per cent max speed with and without IGV modulation. The company has also initiated the development for integrating afterburner technology on engine. In March 2019, first test with "basic afterburner" configuration was conducted on the engine.

Specifications

See also

References 

Gas turbines